Juan José Ferraro (5 September 1923 – 18 November 1973) was an Argentine footballer. He played mostly in his country for Vélez Sársfield, scoring 111 goals in 238 games with the team in the Argentine Primera División, and a total of 157 goals in 303 games (counting second division matches). Ferraro is the second top scorer in the club's history, behind Carlos Bianchi (who has 206 goals).

Playing career

Club
Ferraro completed his youth career in Vélez Sársfield, and debuted with the team in the early 1940s. He holds the distinction of scoring the first goal in the Estadio José Amalfitani's history, in the inauguration friendly match that Vélez drew with River Plate 2–2. With Vélez, Ferraro played until 1949, helping the team return to the Argentine Primera División in 1943 by winning the second division championship.

In 1949, Ferraro joined Boca Juniors, who was struggling to avoid relegation from the first division. Boca paid a $500,000 Argentine peso fee, a record for Vélez at the time. The forward helped Boca avoid relegation, and stayed in the club until 1953, when he returned to Vélez. In total, he played 323 games and scored 143 goals in the Argentine Primera División with both clubs.

Towards the end of his career, he had his only experience outside Argentina, playing in Colombia for Independiente Santa Fe. There, he won the Colombian First Division in 1958.

National team
Ferraro played with the Argentina national team between 1945 and 1956, winning the 1945 South American Championship with his country.

Coaching career
After retiring in Independiente Santa Fe, Ferraro took up manager duties in the club. He also coached Vélez Sársfield in 1964.

Honours

Club
Vélez Sársfield
 Argentine Second Division: 1943

Independiente Santa Fe
 Colombian First Division: 1958

International
Argentina
 South American Championship: 1945

Notes
1Total caps and goals in the club, accounted for both first and second division.

References

External links

1923 births
1973 deaths
Place of birth missing
Argentine footballers
Argentine football managers
Argentina international footballers
Argentine Primera División players
Primera Nacional players
Categoría Primera A players
Club Atlético Vélez Sarsfield footballers
Boca Juniors footballers
Independiente Santa Fe footballers
Independiente Santa Fe managers
Club Atlético Vélez Sarsfield managers
Argentine expatriate footballers
Expatriate footballers in Colombia
Association football forwards